The I Corps of the Grande Armée was a French military unit that existed during the Napoleonic Wars.  Though disbanded in 1814, following the Treaty of Fontainebleau, it was reformed in April 1815 following the return of Napoléon during the Hundred Days.  During the Hundred Days, the corps formed part of the quickly re-formed Army of the North.

Campaigns
During the mobilisation by Napoléon in 1803, and the subsequent ordnance reforming the army, the new "Army of Hanover or Armée de Hanovre" was formed in French occupied Hanover.  This new army was the size of a corps, but under this reorganisation this meant the corps was to be deemed an army (for psychological reasons).  On 17 June 1805 Jean Baptiste Bernadotte was made Governor of Hanover, and on 29 August 1805 took control of the new I Corps, and remained in this role for another seven years.

War of the Third Coalition
When the War of the Third Coalition was declared, the Army of Hanover was separate from the new Army of Hanover (responsible for the defence of Hanover) and the I Corps.  This new corps was formed as part of what later became the famed Grande Armée.  On 29 August 1805 the I Corps arrived in Würzburg, and tasked with providing support to the Bavarian Army (now a French ally).  During the famed Ulm campaign, the I Corps formed part of the far left flank, preventing the possible retreat of the Austrians under General Karl Mack von Leiberich.  As Russian General Mikhail Kutuzov arrived in Eastern Austria/Bavaria, the reality of the situation caused a general retreat towards Moravia, and the I Corps was tasked with ensuring they wouldn't escape.  This plan however failed, and it was because of this move that the Battle of Austerlitz in-fact went ahead, because of Kutuzov's successful retreat.

Below is the order of battle of the corps on the eve of the Grande Armée's crossing of the Rhine into (what is now) Germany.

War of the Fourth Coalition
The corps took part in the battles of Schleiz, Halle, and Lübeck in 1806, and Mohrungen and Spanden in 1807. After Bernadotte was wounded at Spanden, General Claude Victor-Perrin led the I Corps at Friedland where his tactics earned him a marshal's baton.

Order of battle, 1808

Russian campaign
The corps was reorganised into a strength of five infantry divisions for the invasion of Russia in 1812 and Marshal Louis-Nicolas Davout was appointed to lead it. At the crossing of the Niemen River in 1812, the size of I Corps was around 79,000 men, but six weeks later, about 60,000 men remained. By the end of the Russian campaign, only 2,235 men remained.

Under Davout, the I Army Corps left Minsk on 12 July 1812 to cut off Pyotr Bagration from Barclay de Tolly. It fought at Battle of Smolensk (1812), Borodino, Vyazma, and Krasnoi before dissolving as an effective unit during the retreat from Moscow.

War of the Sixth Coalition
In 1813, the I Corps was reconstituted and placed under the command of General Dominique Vandamme. The corps was destroyed at Kulm, with the remnants surrendering together with XIV Corps following the siege of Dresden in November 1813.

Order of battle, 1813

Order of battle, 1814

War of the Seventh Coalition
The corps was rebuilt in 1815 during the Hundred Days, and was assigned to General Jean-Baptiste Drouet, under whom it fought at the Battle of Waterloo.

Order of battle, 1815

Notes

References

GAI01
Military units and formations established in 1805
Military units and formations disestablished in 1813
Military units and formations established in 1815
Military units and formations disestablished in 1815